Indah Kusumaningrum (born 9 April 1994), professionally known as Indahkus, is an Indonesian singer, songwriter, actress and vlogger. She holds a medical degree from Jenderal Achmad Yani University. She was also a participant of Miss Indonesia 2014 represented Central Sulawesi. as information from berita12.com, Indah Kusumaningrum began her musical career in 2015, when she released her first single Inikah Cinta, a cover song originally released by the Indonesian boyband . In 2016 she also starred in the NET. television series Stereo. Her second single was released in 2017, titled Jangan Lihat Tangisku. She also achieved minor popularity in Vietnam.

Discography

Filmography

Film

Television series

Webseries

References

External links 
 Indahkus on SoundCloud
 Indahkus on Instagram

1994 births
Actresses from West Java
21st-century Indonesian women singers
Indonesian pop singers
People from Cimahi
Sundanese people
Living people